West Fork Township is an inactive township in Washington County, Arkansas, United States.

West Fork Township was established in 1880.

References

Townships in Washington County, Arkansas
Townships in Arkansas